Comanche Reservoir is a large reservoir in the Comanche Peak Wilderness in the Roosevelt National Forest within Colorado, United States. It lies on several hiking trails and is close to the Pingree Park wilderness campus of Colorado State University.

This body of water is not to be confused with Comanche Lake, which is shortly to the reservoir's west.

References

External links
  which shows maps of this area and access to the crash site of a bomber aircraft

Reservoirs in Colorado
Roosevelt National Forest
Lakes of Larimer County, Colorado